Gaspar de Molina y Oviedo (1679–1744) was a Spanish cardinal.

References

External links and additional sources
 (for Chronology of Bishops)  
 (for Chronology of Bishops) 

18th-century Spanish cardinals
Bishops of Barcelona
Bishops of Málaga
People from Mérida, Spain
1679 births
1744 deaths
Roman Catholic bishops of Santiago de Cuba